Pia Ann-Kristin Johansson (born 16 November 1960 in Umeå) is a Swedish actor, lecturer and examinator.

Johansson studied at the Skara scene school, which was followed by a degree from Swedish National Academy of Mime and Acting in 1989. After studying she was employed at Stockholm City Theatre's permanent ensemble. She has been a guest on a number of productions, such as På minuten, Så ska det låta´ and the radio show Sommar.
She has also taken part in the TV program Parlamentet. Johansson participated in Let's Dance 2016 which was broadcast on TV4.

References

External links

1960 births
Living people
People from Umeå
Swedish stage actresses